Agan Tavas (Our Language) is a society which exists to promote the Cornish language and is represented on the Cornish Language Partnership. It was formed in 1987 to promote the use of Cornish as a spoken language in the Cornish revival. At that time only those observed to be using the language fluently could become members by invitation. In 1990 Agan Tavas was reformed by its members into an open society with the aim of ensuring continued support for the Unified form of revived Cornish first put forward in 1929 by Robert Morton Nance.

Orthographic Standards
Agan Tavas recognises the validity of any form of Revived Cornish based on orthography used by Cornish people at any time in the history of the language. It opposes the use of what it sees as invented forms of the language which lack any historical authenticity.

Agan Tavas received a boost in its membership after 1995 when Nicholas Williams of University College Dublin claimed in his book Cornish Today that the form of Cornish known as Kernewek Kemmyn "Common Cornish", devised by Ken George and favoured by the Kesva an Taves Kernewek "Cornish Language Board", was badly flawed.

At present, Agan Tavas supports the amendments made to Unified Cornish but respects the rights of its members to use either Unified Cornish or Unified Cornish Revised. It maintains a list of classes using historical Cornish, organises events for its members and publishes books in both Unified and Unified Cornish Revised. It produces for its members the four monthly bilingual magazine, An Gowsva "The Talking Shop".

Both previous Chairmen, Andrew Climo and Craig Weatherhill, have been advocates of bringing the language community together by means of a Standard Written Form based on traditional forms of Cornish. At an extraordinary general meeting in September 2008, the membership of the Society overwhelmingly voted to support the Standard Written Form (albeit in such a manner that would protect the teaching of the traditional language), as well as the orthography known as Kernowek Standard.

See also

Languages of the United Kingdom

External links
Agan Tavas - website

Cornish language
Celtic language advocacy organizations
1987 establishments in the United Kingdom